The following is an overview of public housing estates in Yau Tong, Kwun Tong, Kowloon, Hong Kong, including Home Ownership Scheme (HOS), Private Sector Participation Scheme (PSPS), and Tenants Purchase Scheme (TPS) estates.

History

Overview

Ko Cheung Court 

Ko Cheung Court consists of nine blocks built in 2004.

Developed in the Ko Chiu Road Redevelopment Phase 5, the estate was planned to be an HOS estate. However, five blocks were converted to public rental housing and another four blocks were converted to government quarters before occupation.

Houses

Ko Chun Court 

Ko Chun Court is an HOS court in Yau Tong, and was built as a part of the demolished Ko Chiu Road Estate. It consists of five blocks built in 1995.

Houses

Ko Yee Estate 

Ko Yee Estate is built as a part of the demolished Ko Chiu Road Estate. The estate comprises four blocks offering 1,300 units.

Houses

Lei Yue Mun Estate 

Lei Yue Mun Estate consists of five residential blocks built in 2001, 2002, 2007 and 2016.

Houses

Yau Mei Court and Yau Chui Court 

Yau Mei Court and Yau Chui Court are HOS courts and government quarters in Yau Tong, located along Lei Yue Mun Road next to Yau Tong MTR station.

Yau Tong Centre 

Yau Tong Centre is a HOS and TPS court in Yau Tong, near Yau Tong MTR station, Yau Tong Bus Terminus, Lei Yue Mun Estate and Yau Tong Industrial Area. It consists of nine blocks built in 1981.

Houses

Yau Tong Estate 

Yau Tong Estate was a resettlement estate but it is now redeveloped.

Yau Lai Estate 

Yau Lai Estate is a public housing estate located near Eastern Harbour Crossing and Yau Tong MTR station. The estate was developed in four phases. Formerly an HOS estate, Phase 1 consists of six residential blocks completed in 2005. Phase 3 consists of 2 blocks completed in 2008. Phase 4 consists of 3 blocks completed in 2009. Phase 5 and 6 consist of 2 blocks completed in 2011. Phase 7 consist of 2 blocks completed in 2019.

Houses

References 

Yau Tong
Kwun Tong District